What It Is may refer to:

Music

Album
 What It Is (Boogaloo Joe Jones album), 1971
 What It Is, a Cordelia's Dad album
 What It Is (Mal Waldron album), 1981
 What It Is (PSD album), 1999
 What It Is (Jacky Terrasson album), 1999
 What It Is!, a 2013 album by Kahil El'Zabar
 What It Is! Funky Soul and Rare Grooves, a box set by various artists that won a Grammy Award for Best Boxed or Special Limited Edition Package

Song
 "What It Is" (Busta Rhymes song), from the 2001 album Genesis
 "What It Is" (Gorilla Zoe song), 2009
 "What It Is" (Jonathan Davis song), a song by Korn frontman Jonathan Davis, 2018
 "What It Is" (Mark Knopfler song), a 2000 song by Mark Knopfler from Sailing to Philadelphia
 "What It Is (Strike a Pose)", a 2008 song by Lil Mama from VYP (Voice of the Young People)
 "What It Is", a Black Eyed Peas song from the album Behind the Front, 1998
 "What It Is", a Paul McCartney song from the album Run Devil Run, 1999

Other
 What It Is, a comedy stand-up DVD by Dylan Moran
 What It Is, a graphic novel by Lynda Barry

See also

 
 It Is What It Is (disambiguation)
 What is it (disambiguation)